The Night of the Generals is a 1967 World War II mystery film directed by Anatole Litvak and produced by Sam Spiegel. It stars Peter O'Toole, Omar Sharif, Tom Courtenay, Donald Pleasence, Joanna Pettet and Philippe Noiret. The screenplay by Joseph Kessel and Paul Dehn was loosely based on the beginning of the novel of the same name by German author Hans Hellmut Kirst. The writing credits also include the line "based on an incident written by James Hadley Chase"; a subplot from Chase's 1952 novel The Wary Transgressor.  Gore Vidal is said to have contributed to the screenplay, but was not credited. The musical score was composed by Maurice Jarre.

The film was a French-British-American international co-production. Parts of this Western-made film were shot on location in Warsaw, which at the time was behind the Iron Curtain. The last scenes of the film were shot in Munich.

Plot
The murder of a prostitute, who was also a German agent, in German-occupied Warsaw in 1942 causes Major Grau of the Abwehr to start an investigation. His evidence soon points to the killer being one of three German generals: General von Seidlitz-Gabler; General Kahlenberge, his chief of staff; or General Tanz, a highly decorated officer and a favorite of Adolf Hitler. Grau's investigation is cut short by his sudden promotion and transfer to Paris at the instigation of these officers.

The case in Warsaw remains closed until all three officers meet in Paris in July 1944. Paris is then a hotbed of intrigue, with senior Wehrmacht officers plotting to assassinate Hitler and overthrow the Nazi government. Kahlenberge is deeply involved in the plot, while von Seidlitz-Gabler is aware of its existence but is sitting on the fence, awaiting the outcome, whilst having various extramarital affairs. Tanz is unaware of the plot and remains totally loyal to Hitler; at some point during the War prior, he transferred to the SS, and is a Waffen-SS General (SS-Obergruppenführer), in command of the SS-Panzer Division Nibelungen (a fictitious stand-in for the 12th SS Panzer Division).

On the night of 19 July 1944, Tanz orders his driver, Kurt Hartmann, to procure a French prostitute; Tanz butchers her so as to implicate Hartmann, but offers Hartmann the chance to desert, which he accepts. When Grau, who is now a Lieutenant Colonel, learns of the murder, committed in the same manner as the first, he resumes his investigation and concludes that Tanz is the killer. However, his timing is unfortunate, because the very next day is the 20 July assassination attempt. While Grau is accusing Tanz face to face, word arrives that Hitler has survived, so Tanz kills Grau and labels him as one of the plot conspirators to cover his tracks.

Jumping to 1965, the murder of a prostitute in Hamburg draws the attention of Interpol Inspector Morand, who owes a debt of gratitude to Grau for not revealing his connection to the French Resistance during the war. Almost certain there is a connection to Grau's 1942 case, Morand reopens the cold case, soon finding a link to the 1944 murder as well. 
 
Morand begins to tie up the loose ends. He finds no criminal activity from Kahlenberge or Seidlitz-Gabler. However, Morand finds a potential witness when Seidlitz-Galber mentions that he rarely sees his daughter, Ulrike, who lives in a farm near Munich. Morand confronts Tanz, recently released after serving 20 years as a war criminal, at a reunion dinner for Tanz's former panzer division. When Morand produces Hartmann, who has since married Ulrike, as his witness, Tanz goes into a vacant room and shoots himself.

Cast

 Peter O'Toole as General Wilhelm Tanz
 Omar Sharif as Major (Lt. Colonel) Grau
 Tom Courtenay as Lance Corporal Kurt Hartmann
 Donald Pleasence as General Klaus Kahlenberge
 Joanna Pettet as Ulrike von Seidlitz-Gabler
 Philippe Noiret as Inspector Morand
 Charles Gray as General Herbert von Seidlitz-Gabler
 Coral Browne as Eleonore von Seidlitz-Gabler
 John Gregson as Colonel Sandauer
 Nigel Stock as Sergeant Otto Köpke
 Christopher Plummer as Field Marshal Erwin Rommel
 Juliette Gréco as Juliette
 Yves Brainville as Liesowski
 Sacha Pitoëff as Doctor
 Charles Millot as Wionczek
 Raymond Gerome as Colonel in War Room
 Véronique Vendell as Monique
 Pierre Mondy as Kopatski
 Eléonore Hirt as Melanie
 Nicole Courcel as Raymonde
 Jenny Orleans as Otto's wife
 Gérard Buhr as Colonel Claus von Stauffenberg
 Michael Goodliffe as Hauser
 Gordon Jackson as Captain Gottfried Engel
 Patrick Allen as Colonel Mannheim
 Harry Andrews as General Karl-Heinrich von Stülpnagel (uncredited)

Production
Both O'Toole and Sharif were hesitant to take on their roles for this film. Feeling they owed it to producer Sam Spiegel for making them international stars in Lawrence of Arabia, they did so anyway. Due to their previous contracts, O'Toole's and Sharif's combined salaries were less than Donald Pleasence's.

Gore Vidal, one of the many writers of the script claimed he urged Spiegel to use a "new, hot director", but Spiegel chose the experienced Anatole Litvak who owned the rights to the novel.

Reception
Bosley Crowther, in an unenthusiastic review for The New York Times, described the movie as "a lurid and mordant screen account of the unmasking of a general officer who likes to disembowel prostitutes":It is an engrossing exhibition that mainly gives Mr. O'Toole a chance to build up the tensions and the twitches of a sex maniac, with something of the glazed-eyed characteristic of those old vampires who used to suck blood. But once this phase is completed—once we know who the killer is and have made the obvious connection of his war crimes and his private deeds—the excitement of the picture is over. At least, it was for me.

References

External links

 
 
 
 
 
 

1967 films
Columbia Pictures films
1960s English-language films
English-language French films
Films about the 20 July plot
Films based on German novels
Films based on military novels
Films based on works by James Hadley Chase
Films directed by Anatole Litvak
Films shot in Poland
Films shot in Warsaw
Films set in Warsaw
Films set in Paris
Films set in Hamburg
Films set in West Germany
French World War II films
Horizon Pictures films
British neo-noir films
British serial killer films
British World War II films
Films produced by Sam Spiegel
Films scored by Maurice Jarre
Cultural depictions of Erwin Rommel
Films set in 1942
Films set in 1943
Films set in 1944
Films set in 1965
Films about Interpol
1960s British films
French neo-noir films
French serial killer films
1960s French films